Domegge di Cadore is a comune (municipality) in the Province of Belluno in the Italian region of Veneto, located about  north of Venice and about  northeast of Belluno.

Geography

The town is located in the Dolomites of the upper Piave valley, on the right bank of the river and at an altitude ranging from 655 m a.s.l. of the old part of the hamlet of Vallesella, up to 900 of the hamlet of Grea.

Mountains

The mountain groups on which the territory extends are Monfalconi, Spalti di Toro to the east; Marmarole to the west. Among the most representative peaks is Monte Montanèl (2,441 m) of the Monte Cridola Group.

Rivers and lakes

The town is crossed by the Piave river, harnessed by the Pieve di Cadore dam to form the lake of Centro Cadore. On its territory, to form the border with the adjacent municipality of Calalzo di Cadore, the Molinà and Talagona streams, while the Cridola stream, all tributaries of the aforementioned Piave, separates it only administratively from the municipality of Lorenzago di Cadore. For over 120 years these places have been famous for the production of spectacle frames and still today a popular destination for purchasing optical products.

History

From the Bronze Age to the Romans

The discovery in a quarry in the locality of Crodola (m.801) of a sickle and an ax with bronze wings dated to the 13th-12th century BC. it is the oldest sign of human presence in Centro Cadore. Another very interesting find is the iron helmet found in Pegnola (Vallesella) dated to the IV-III century BC.
Coins ranging from Vespasian (69-79 AD) to Marcus Aurelius (161-180 AD) have been found in various locations; Col de Medol, Vince, Casa De Bernardo. Finally, in the center of Domegge a burial of three buried (two adults and a young person) was found, supine with their heads facing north. The kit consisted of a necklace with glass paste pearls, silver earring, armilla and bronze chain; the material has been dated to the 6th-7th century AD. During the excavation on the state road to lay the methane, a human skull was found very close to the previous site; therefore one could hypothesize a necropolis.

Construction works in 2004 made it possible, thanks to the attention of the Group of the Padovan Superintendent, to confirm the presence of the sepulchral area. Another necropolis was probably located in the area to the east of the church; at the beginning of the twentieth century in the locality of Le Cioupe two skeletons and parts of bronze objects, perhaps armor, were found. During the works in via Trieste 6, two or three skeletons and red and yellow terracotta vases, animal bones and a chain with collar were found. In 1865 a skull was found together with a pin and a circular plate. This exhibit had ten rays marked by small pellets which were distributed over the entire circumference; a thread twisted around the plate had a white and light blue glass pendant.

The area is close to Col de Medol, where it seems there were walls on the site of the discovery of some coins. From the side of the hill overlooking the church, a stinking (sulphurous?) Source of water flowed through the meadows of Le Cioupe and then flows into the Piave. Also worth mentioning is the area of Facen, on the opposite side of the lake, where Alessio De Bon had received news of the discovery of burials without equipment, which he attributed to the Middle Ages. The area has large terraces and is sunny, the toponym is perhaps of Rhaetian origin, which re-proposes the question of the cultures present in Cadore in the pre-Roman period.

Recent history

At the beginning of the twentieth century the Domeggese community was involved in the migratory phenomena that affected the Cadore area and in general the entire peninsula: an emigrant from Vallesella is counted among the victims of the most serious mining disaster that the history of the United States remembers, which occurred on December 6, 1907 in Monongah, West Virginia.

In the second half of the twentieth century, the whole Cadore area was affected by a sudden improvement in living conditions due to the development of the eyewear industry and consequently the abandonment of agro-forestry-pastoral activities. Among the most important realities to remember the company Giorgio Fedon. In August 1992 it jumped to the fore in the national crime news for having been the scene of the mysterious suicide of Don Mario Bisaglia, brother of Senator Antonio Bisaglia, who was found dead in the lake of Centro Cadore.

Gallery

References

External links
 Official website

Cities and towns in Veneto